The third season of reality television series Prince Charming premiered on August 17, 2021 on the premium section of streaming service RTL+. This season, like the previous two, is also going to be shown on German TV channel VOX, which began airing on February 7, 2022. The third Prince Charming was 31-year-old car salesman Kim Tränka.

The season ended on October 19, 2021 (RTL+) and on March 28, 2022 (VOX), with 22-year-old Maurice Schmitz being named the winner. At the reunion, Tränka and Schmitz revealed that they were still a couple.

Filming 
The third season of Prince Charming, just like the previous two, was shot on the Greek island of  Crete in early 2021.

Contestants 
This season featured 18 contestants.

Contestant Progress 

  The contestant went on a Group date with the Prince.
  After the Group date, the contestant went on a date with the Prince.
  The contestant went on a date with the Prince.
  The contestant stayed a night together with the Prince.
  The contestant quit the competition.
  The contestant had to give up his tie and was eliminated.
  The contestant was the runner up.
  The contestant won Prince Charming.

References 

2021 German television seasons
2022 German television seasons